Army Public School may refer to:

 Indian Army Public Schools
 Army Public Schools & Colleges System, Pakistan